Beydili is a village in Karaman Province, Turkey

The population of the village was 227 as of 2014. 
The name Beydili refers to a Turkmen tribe with the same name.  Although initially they were nomadic, they were settled by the Ottoman government. The first written document about the Beydili village was dated 1845.

Main economic activity is agriculture and animal husbandry.

References

Villages in Karaman Central District